Hartmut Abendschein (Schwäbisch Hall, 7 October 1969) is a German – Swiss writer.

Biography 
Hartmut Abendschein attended German studies and English studies in Stuttgart, Constance and Glasgow. He lives in Bern since 2003 where he has a blog called taberna kritika – kleine formen.

Works 
 Notula Nova – Theorie & Praxis (Auswahl). In: Idiome Nr. 4. Klever, Wien 2011.
 The Chomskytree-Haiku (Rhizome(Rhizome)) / TCT-H (R(R)). Eine intermediale Allegorie poetischen Arbeitens. online installation, Bern 2011.
 Ueberich I. Datenbank der Realfiktionen / Database of real fiction 1(2)/2009. Video (60 min.), Bern 2011.
 Franz Kafka – Kleine Formen; gesammelt und gelesen von Fritz Michel und Hartmut Abendschein. edition taberna kritika, Bern 2010, .
 Bibliotheca Caelestis. Tiddlywikiroman. edition taberna kritika, Bern 2008
 Die Träume meiner Frau. Hybride Stoffe. Athena Verlag, Oberhausen 2007
 die horizontlüge. gedichte & kleine prosa. edition taberna kritika, Bern 2007
 Franz Dodel/Hartmut Abendschein (Ed.): Wissen und Gewissen, eine literarische Anthologie. Stämpfli, Bern 2005, .

External links 
 
 website of Hartmut Abendschein

References 

1969 births
Living people
People from Schwäbisch Hall

Writers from Baden-Württemberg
Swiss writers
German male writers